Jerome J. "Jerry" Reppa (April 14, 1925 – October 1, 2014) was an American lawyer and politician.

Born in East Chicago, Indiana, he graduated from Catholic Central High School (Bishop Noll Institute) in 1943. Reppa then served in the United States Army during World War II. He then went to Butler University and received his law degree from the University of Miami School of Law. He was a member of the Florida and Indiana bars. He served in the Indiana House of Representatives from 1972 to 1990 and was a member of the Republican Party. He died in Munster, Indiana.

He was a Roman Catholic.

Notes

1925 births
2014 deaths
People from East Chicago, Indiana
Butler University alumni
University of Miami School of Law alumni
Florida lawyers
Indiana lawyers
Republican Party members of the Indiana House of Representatives
People from Munster, Indiana
20th-century American lawyers